The Buck Camp Patrol Cabin in Yosemite National Park was listed on the National Register of Historic Places in 2014.

It is a one-story log cabin built in National Park Service Rustic style.

References

Log cabins
National Register of Historic Places in Madera County, California
National Park Service rustic in Yosemite National Park